Forlì is a comune and city in Italy.

Forli or Forlì may also refer to:
 Forli (horse), a racehorse
 Forlì del Sannio, Molise, Italy
 Forlì F.C., an Italian football club
 36th Infantry Division Forlì, of the Italian Army
 Olav Førli (1920–2011), Norwegian football goalkeeper